The Public Debt Management Agency (PDMA) is a government agency in Greece. Its stated purpose is the: "improvement of the cost of funding and the achievement of the best possible structure (composition and maturity) of the public debt according to the needs of the Hellenic State and the prevailing international economic conditions."

Organisation

The PDMA was founded in 1999. It is headed by a Board of Directors, appointed by the Minister of Finance. This Board of Directors includes the Director General of the PDMA, who handles the day-to-day running of the agency. The current make-up is:

 Chairman of the Board: Athanasios Petralias, Secretary General of Fiscal Policy
 Deputy Chairman of the Board: Ioulia Armagou, General Director of Fiscal Policy and Budget
 Member of the Board: Theodoros Mitrakos, Deputy Governor of the Bank of Greece
 Member of the Board: Christos Triantopoulos, Secretary General of Economic Policy of the Hellenic Ministry of Finance
 Member of the Board: Dimitris Tsakonas, General Director of the PDMA

Director Generals of the PDMA

 Dimitris Tsakonas, 2018–present
 Stelios Papadopoulos, 2012–2018
 Petros Christodoulou, 2010–2012
 Spyros Papanicolaou, 2005–2010
 Christoforos Sardelis, 1999–2004

Sources:

See also

 Greek government-debt crisis

References

Greek government-debt crisis
1999 establishments in Greece